The PowerBook 100 series is a line of laptop PCs produced by Apple Computer.

In October 1991, Apple released the first three PowerBooks: the low-end PowerBook 100, the more powerful PowerBook 140, and the high-end PowerBook 170, the only one with an active matrix display.

These machines caused a stir in the industry with their compact dark grey cases, use of a trackball, and the clever positioning of the keyboard which left room for palmrests on either side of the pointing device. Portable PC computers at the time tended to have the keyboard forward towards the user, with empty space behind it, so this was a surprising innovation and set the standard layout all future notebook computers would follow.

The PowerBook 140 and 170 were designed first. The 100 benefited from their development and by components miniaturized by Sony after Apple sent them schematics of the Mac Portable. The 100, however, did not sell well until Apple dropped the price substantially.

The 100 and 200 series PowerBooks were intended to tie into the rest of the Apple desktop products using the corporate Snow White design language incorporated into all product designs since 1986. However, unlike the Macintosh Portable which was essentially a battery-powered desktop in weight and size, the light colors and decorative recessed lines did not seem appropriate for the scaled-down designs. In addition to adopting the darker-gray color scheme which co-ordinated with the official corporate look, they also adopted a raised series of ridges mimicking the indented lines on the desktops. The innovative look not only unified their entire product line, but set Apple apart in the marketplace and had the added benefit of masking fingerprints while the ridges provided added traction with which to grip the PowerBook. These early series would be the last to use the aging Snow White look; a new look was debuted on the 190 and the 500 series.

The first series of PowerBooks were hugely successful, capturing 40% of all laptop sales. But several factors hampered Apple's efforts to introduce newer models and keep ahead of competitors. One was the departure of the original PowerBook team to work at Compaq. Another was that Apple's plans to move on from the 68000 and 68030 CPUs were thwarted by overheating problems with the 68040. The 100-series PowerBook were stuck with chips that could not compete with Intel 80486-based PC laptops introduced in 1994. For several years, new PowerBook and PowerBook Duo computers were introduced which featured incremental improvements, including color screens, but by mid-decade, most other companies had copied the majority of the PowerBook's features, and Apple was unable to regain their lead.

The original PowerBook 100, 140, and 170 were replaced by the 145 (updated to the 145B in 1993), 160, and 180 in 1992, with the 160 and 180 having video output allowing them to drive an external monitor. The PowerBook 180 had a superb-for-the-time active-matrix grayscale display, making it popular. In 1993, the PowerBook 165c was the first PowerBook with a color screen, later followed by the 180c. In 1994, the last true member of the 100-series form factor introduced was the PowerBook 150, targeted at value-minded consumers and students.

The PowerBook 190, released in 1995, bears no resemblance to the rest of the PowerBook 100 series, and is in fact simply a Motorola 68LC040-based version of the PowerBook 5300, and the last PowerBook model to be manufactured using a Motorola 68k-family processor). However, like the 190, the 150 also used the 5300 IDE-based logic-board architecture. From the 100's 68000 processor, to the 190's 68LC040 processor, the 100 series PowerBooks span the entire Apple 68K line, with the 190 even upgradable to a PowerPC processor. The PowerBook Duo spanned the 68030 line of processors and sold through the PowerPC transition to the PowerPC 603e processor with the 2300, also based on the 5300's internal architecture.

In February 2005, Mobile PC magazine named the PowerBook 100 its choice as the "#1 gadget of all time."

Technical specifications 
Listed chronologically, by release date

Timeline

References

External links

Apple-History

100
Computer-related introductions in 1991